The Pajottenland (in English occasionally Payottenland) is a distinct region within the Flemish Brabant province and the south-western part of the Brussels Region of Belgium. The region is located west-southwest of Brussels. The Pajottenland is predominantly farmland, with occasional gently rolling hills, and lies mostly between the rivers Dender and Zenne / Senne. The area has historically provided food and drink for the citizens of Brussels, especially Lambic beers, which are only produced here and in the Zenne valley where Brussels is.

Geography

The Pajottenland is generally understood to cover the following municipalities and submunicipalities:
Affligem: Essene, Hekelgem and Teralfene 
Asse: Asse, Bekkerzeel, Kobbegem, Mollem, Relegem and Zellik
Bever
Dilbeek: Dilbeek, Itterbeek (with Sint-Anna-Pede), Schepdaal (with Sint-Gertrudis-Pede), Sint-Martens-Bodegem, Sint-Ulriks-Kapelle, Groot-Bijgaarden
Galmaarden: Galmaarden, Tollembeek, Vollezele
Gooik: Gooik (with Strijland), Kester, Leerbeek, Oetingen
Herne: Herne (with Kokejane), Herfelingen, Sint-Pieters-Kapelle
Lennik: Gaasbeek, Sint-Kwintens-Lennik (with Eizeringen), Sint-Martens-Lennik
Liedekerke
Pepingen: Pepingen, Beert, Bellingen, Bogaarden, Elingen, Heikruis
Roosdaal: Pamel (with Ledeberg), Borchtlombeek, Onze-Lieve-Vrouw-Lombeek, Strijtem, Kattem
Sint-Pieters-Leeuw: Sint-Pieters-Leeuw, Oudenaken, Ruisbroek, Sint-Laureins-Berchem, Vlezenbeek
Ternat: Ternat, Sint-Katherina-Lombeek, Wambeek

According to a lawyer named De Gronckel who first described it, the Pajottenland also includes Liedekerke and the Ninove deelgemeenten Neigem and Lieferinge. The rural part of Anderlecht, particularly in earlier times before it became a municipality of the Brussels region, may also be included.

The tourist area marketed under the name Pajottenland en Zennevallei (Pajottenland and Zenne Valley) also includes the municipalities Beersel, Drogenbos, Halle, Linkebeek, Sint-Genesius-Rode, which are clustered around the Zenne Valley to the south-west of the main Pajottenland region.

See also 
Communities, regions and provinces of Belgium

References
 Tim Webb, Chris Pollard, Joris Pattyn, Lambicland,

External links
 
 The Pajottenland, official Pajottenland & Zennevallei tourist site
 The Pajottenland

Geography of Flemish Brabant
Regions of Flanders
Areas of Belgium